Lâm Sơn is a commune (xã) and village of Ninh Sơn District, Ninh Thuận Province, Vietnam.

It is located at the foot of the scenic Ngoạn Mục Pass (locally known as the Sông Pha Pass).

Lâm Sơn was once connected to the Vietnamese railway network by the now-defunct Da Lat–Thap Cham Railway. The railway heading seaward to Thap Cham was opened in 1919, and the section inland to Da Lat opened in 1932. Due to the mountainous terrain inland from Song Pha, that section used rack rails, the only such railway in Vietnam.

Notes and references

External links
 Map of Song Pha area and Ngoan Muc Pass. Mekongexpress.com.

Populated places in Ninh Thuận province